James Walter Cunningham (born March 11, 1939) is a former American football fullback in the National Football League for the Washington Redskins.  He played college football at the University of Pittsburgh and was drafted in the third round of the 1961 NFL Draft. Cunningham was also drafted in the fourteenth round of the 1961 AFL Draft by the New York Titans. Cunningham played three seasons for the Redskins from 1961 to 1963 and played minor league football with the Wheeling/Ohio Valley Ironmen for six seasons.

References 

1939 births
Living people
American football fullbacks
Players of American football from Pennsylvania
People from Connellsville, Pennsylvania
Pittsburgh Panthers football players
Washington Redskins players